Roston is a hamlet in Derbyshire, England. The Roston Inn (known locally as 'The Shant') is at the junction of Mill Lane and Lid Lane in the hamlet. Roston is in the parish of Norbury with Roston.

Roston Common is a short distance east from Roston. George Eliot's father, Robert Evans was born here and sang in the choir at Norbury church.

History
Like many places in Derbyshire, Roston was mentioned in the Domesday Book, in 1086, amongst the many manors given to Henry de Ferrers by William the Conqueror. It is mentioned with Norbury and as a place in its own right.

See also
Listed buildings in Norbury and Roston

References

Hamlets in Derbyshire
Derbyshire Dales